Van Morrison: The Concert is the second video released by Northern Irish  singer-songwriter Van Morrison, first released in 1990.  Recorded in New York City the previous year, the concert featured two special guests and long-time friends Mose Allison and John Lee Hooker, each of whom performed some of their own songs. This video mainly consisted of Morrison's work from his last two albums; including four songs from both Avalon Sunset and Irish Heartbeat. The video also features jazz singer Georgie Fame on Hammond organ. Some reviewers have stated that Van Morrison was not in best shape during the concert, his voice was probably strained by a cold.

Track listing
All songs written and arranged by Van Morrison unless stated otherwise.

"I Will Be There" – 2:17
"Whenever God Shines His Light" – 5:27
"Cleaning Windows" – 3:27
"Orangefield" – 2:56
"When Will I Ever Learn to Live in God" – 4:18
"Benediction" (Mose Allison) – 3:00
"Raglan Road" (Traditional) Arr. (Morrison/Paddy Moloney) – 3:44
"Carrickfergus" (Traditional) Arr. (Morrison/Moloney) – 3:23
"Summertime in England/Common One" – 13:25
"Caravan/Birdland" (Morrison), (Joe Zawinul) – 7:31
"Moondance/Fever" (Morrison), (John Davenport/Eddie Cooley) – 12:15
"Star of the County Down" (Traditional) Arr. (Morrison/Moloney) – 2:14
"In the Garden" – 7:33
"Have I Told You Lately" – 3:29
"Gloria/Smokestack Lightning" (Morrison), (Chester Burnett) – 4:28
"Serve Me Right to Suffer/T.B. Sheets" (John Lee Hooker), (Morrison) – 5:22
"Boom Boom" (Hooker) – 3:52
"She Moved Through the Fair" (Traditional) Arr. (Morrison/Moloney) – 4:57

Personnel

The band
Van Morrison – vocals, electric guitar, harmonica
Georgie Fame – organ, backing vocals
Bernie Holland – electric and acoustic guitars, backing vocals
Brian Odgers – bass, backing vocals
Neil Drinkwater – keyboards, accordion
Dave Early – drums
Richie Buckley – vocals on "Common One", soprano and tenor saxophones
Steve Gregory – tenor and baritone saxophones, flute

Special guests
Mose Allison – vocals and keyboard on "Benediction"
John Lee Hooker – vocals and electric guitar on "Serve Me Right to Suffer" and "Boom Boom"

Releases

The video has been released in VHS format and on laserdisc.

Production
Producer and Director – Jon Small
Producers – Van Morrison, Jim Greenhough
Photography – The Douglass Brothers
Design – Bill Smith Studio

References

External links
Van Morrison: The Concert @ IMDb

Van Morrison video albums